Raglan may refer to:

Places

Australia
County of Raglan, a cadastral division in Queensland, Australia
Raglan, New South Wales, a suburb of Bathurst, Australia
Raglan, Queensland, a town in Gladstone Region, Australia
Raglan, Victoria, a town in Australia

Canada
Raglan, Chatham-Kent, Ontario, Canada
Raglan, Durham Regional Municipality, Ontario, a hamlet in Oshawa, Canada
Raglan Mine, a nickel mining complex in northern Quebec, Canada

New Zealand
Raglan, New Zealand, a town on the west coast of the North Island
Raglan (New Zealand electorate), a former parliamentary electorate centred on the town

United Kingdom
Raglan, Monmouthshire, a large village in Wales
Raglan Hundred, a division of the traditional county of Monmouthshire

Other uses 
Raglan (surname)
Raglan sleeve, a type of clothing sleeve popular in sports and exercise wear which took its name from the 1st Baron
Raglan Squire (1912–2004), British architect
Baron Raglan, a title in the Peerage of the United Kingdom
HMS Raglan, a First World War I Royal Navy monitor named after the 1st Baron

See also
Raglan Road (disambiguation)
Ragland (disambiguation)